The Knight's Cross of the Iron Cross (German language: Ritterkreuz des Eisernen Kreuzes) and its variants were the highest military awards in Nazi Germany. During or shortly after World War II, 457 German servicemen of the Waffen-SS, including volunteers from Belgium, Croatia, Denmark, Estonia, France, Hungary, Latvia, Netherlands, and Norway, received the Knight's Cross of the Iron Cross. Of these, 411 presentations were formally made and evidence of the award is still available in the German Federal Archives. One recipient, Hermann Fegelein, was court-martialed and executed on 29 April 1945. According to German law, he was deprived of rank and all awards previously. Fegelein must therefore be considered a de facto but not de jure recipient. A further 46 Knight's Cross, nine Knight's Cross with Oak Leaves, and four Knight's Cross with Oak Leaves and Swords recipients are either lacking the evidence to sustain their listings or received the award under questionable legal terms. However, all of them were accepted by the Association of Knight's Cross Recipients (Ordensgemeinschaft der Ritterkreuzträger des Eisernen Kreuzes e.V.) as legitimate recipients.

Recipients
Recipients are grouped by grades of the Knight's Cross and listed alphabetically for the lowest grade and chronologically by the numbering paradigm for the higher grades.

Knight's Cross with Oak Leaves, Swords and Diamonds
The Knight's Cross with Oak Leaves, Swords, and Diamonds is based on the enactment Reichsgesetzblatt I S. 613 of 28 September 1941 to reward those servicemen who had already been awarded the Oak Leaves with Swords to the Knight's Cross of the Iron Cross. Ultimately, it would be awarded to twenty-seven German soldiers, sailors and airmen, ranging from young fighter pilots to field marshals. Two recipients were members of the Waffen-SS. The list is initially sorted by the chronological number assigned to the recipient.

Knight's Cross with Oak Leaves and Swords
The Knight's Cross with Oak Leaves and Swords is also based on the enactment Reichsgesetzblatt I S. 613 of 28 September 1941 to reward those servicemen who had already been awarded the Oak Leaves to the Knight's Cross of the Iron Cross. The list is initially sorted by the chronological number assigned to the recipient.

Knight's Cross with Oak Leaves
The Knight's Cross with Oak Leaves was based on the enactment Reichsgesetzblatt I S. 849 of 3 June 1940. The last officially announced number for the Oak Leaves was 843. Higher numbers are unofficial and therefore denoted in brackets. The list is initially sorted by the chronological number assigned to the recipient.

Notes

References
Specific

General

External links

Waffen SS